Norman Allen Van Lier III (April 1, 1947 – February 26, 2009) was an American professional basketball player and television broadcaster who spent the majority of his career with the Chicago Bulls.

Early life
Norman Van Lier was born in East Liverpool, Ohio to Helen and Norm Sr., who worked in a steel mill for 31 years. He was raised, along with three brothers and a sister, in Midland, Pennsylvania. Van Lier had three other brothers who died after birth; he named one of them Elgin Baylor Van Lier I. Van Lier would look back fondly to his childhood playing tackle football with a taped coffee can for a ball due to their circumstances. He would later credit this upbringing in forming his famed work ethic later in life.

High school career
Van Lier was a member of the 1965 Midland High School Leopards, considered by many to be one of the greatest high school basketball teams of all time, finishing 28-0 and easily winning the Pennsylvania State Championship. One of Van Lier's teammates was future NBA player Simmie Hill. During weekends, Van Lier would hitchhike to the playgrounds in Harlem, once even playing with Billy Cunningham.

Van Lier was also a co-captain of his football team, where he played both quarterback and safety. He was recruited to play for several colleges, but none allowed him to play his desired position of quarterback. Van Lier had received offers to play professional baseball as well, after starring on his high school and county all-star teams.

College career
Van Lier's modest 6'1" stature and his emphasis on defense kept him under the radar of stardom, and he was not recruited by major basketball powers. He attended Saint Francis University of Pennsylvania, where he eventually emerged as a standout point guard. He graduated from Saint Francis University in 1969.

Professional career

Cincinnati Royals (1969–1971)
The Chicago Bulls selected Van Lier in the third round of the 1969 NBA draft, but immediately traded him to the Cincinnati Royals, with whom he led the NBA in assists in 1971. On January 5 of that year, Van Lier became the first player in NBA history to have a scoreless double-double with zero points, 13 assists and 11 rebounds in a victory against the Los Angeles Lakers. A scoreless double-double did not happen for another 50 years, when on December 26, 2021, rookie Josh Giddey of the Oklahoma City Thunder
compiled 10 assists and 10 rebounds in the Thunder's 117–112 win over the New Orleans Pelicans.

Chicago Bulls (1971–1978)
The Bulls reacquired Van Lier during the 1971–72 season, and he remained with the Bulls until 1978, appearing in three All-Star games (1974, 1976, 1977) over the course of six seasons.

Nicknamed "Stormin' Norman" for his tenacity and aggression, Van Lier was one of the most popular Bulls players of the 1970s. During his ten-year career, Van Lier was named to three NBA All-Defense First Teams and five NBA All-Defense Second Teams. He has the most selections alongside Michael Cooper to not be inducted into the Naismith Basketball Hall of Fame.  He was named to the All-NBA Second Team in 1974.  Van Lier was waived by the Bulls in October 1978.

On January 19, 1977, Van Lier broke the record for the longest successful field goal in NBA history at 84 feet; the record stood for 24 years until Baron Davis eclipsed it on November 17, 2001 from a distance of 89 feet.

Milwaukee Bucks (1978–1979)
After playing briefly with the Milwaukee Bucks, Van Lier retired in 1979 with career totals of 8,770 points and 5,217 assists.

Coaching career
In 1989, Van Lier was the assistant coach of the Worcester Counts in the World Basketball League.

Van Lier was the head basketball coach for the Worcester Vocational Technical High School team during part of the 1989–90 season. His team reached the Massachusetts Division II championship game.

Media career
Van Lier served as a color analyst on Bulls radio broadcasts from 1980 to 1982. In 1989 he was the assistant coach of the Worcester Counts in the World Basketball League. From 1992 to 2009, he was a television pre-game and post-game analyst for Chicago Bulls games. He frequently appeared on other Chicago television programs to discuss the Bulls, and at one point co-hosted a sports talk radio show.

Van Lier also served as a special disc jockey on the Chicago rock music station 97.9 WLUP. In 2002 and 2004, he had supporting roles in the movies Barbershop and Barbershop 2: Back in Business.

Legacy
On June 21, 2008, Van Lier was inducted into the WPIAL Hall of Fame. "Western Pennsylvania is football country, but my years are considered the golden era of basketball not only in the state but maybe the country," Van Lier said that night. "Uniontown, Midland, Schenley and Ambridge could play with anybody, anytime and in any era in the country."

Death
On February 25, 2009, Van Lier was unexpectedly absent from his scheduled television appearance on Comcast SportsNet following a Bulls game. He was found dead in his apartment in Chicago's Near West Side neighborhood on February 26, 2009. Fellow Bulls broadcaster and former Bulls head coach Johnny "Red" Kerr also died later that day.

Career statistics

NBA

Regular season

|-
| style="text-align:left;"|
| style="text-align:left;"|Cincinnati
| 81 ||  || 35.7 || .403 ||  || .741 || 5.0 || 6.2 ||  ||  || 9.5
|-
| style="text-align:left;"|
| style="text-align:left;"|Cincinnati
| style="background:#cfecec;"|82* ||  || 40.5 || .420 ||  || .816 || 7.1 || style="background:#cfecec;"|10.1* ||  ||  || 16.0
|-
| style="text-align:left;"|
| style="text-align:left;"|Cincinnati
| 10 ||  || 27.5 || .311 ||  || .773 || 5.8 || 5.1 ||  ||  || 7.3
|-
| style="text-align:left;"|
| style="text-align:left;"|Chicago
| 69 ||  || 31.0 || .456 ||  || .791 || 4.3 || 7.1 ||  ||  || 12.1
|-
| style="text-align:left;"|
| style="text-align:left;"|Chicago
| 80 ||  || 36.0 || .445 ||  || .787 || 5.5 || 7.1 ||  ||  || 13.9
|-
| style="text-align:left;"|
| style="text-align:left;"|Chicago
| 80 ||  || 35.8 || .406 ||  || .778 || 4.7 || 6.9 || 2.0 || .1 || 14.3
|-
| style="text-align:left;"|
| style="text-align:left;"|Chicago
| 70 ||  || 37.0 || .420 ||  || .792 || 4.7 || 5.8 || 2.0 || .2 || 15.0
|-
| style="text-align:left;"|
| style="text-align:left;"|Chicago
| 76 ||  || 39.8 || .366 ||  || .737 || 5.4 || 6.6 || 2.0 || .3 || 12.6
|-
| style="text-align:left;"|
| style="text-align:left;"|Chicago
| style="background:#cfecec;"|82* ||  || 37.8 || .412 ||  || .778 || 4.5 || 7.8 || 1.6 || .2 || 10.2
|-
| style="text-align:left;"|
| style="text-align:left;"|Chicago
| 78 ||  || 32.4 || .419 ||  || .751 || 3.6 || 6.8 || 1.8 || .1 || 7.3
|-
| style="text-align:left;"|
| style="text-align:left;"|Milwaukee
| 38 ||  || 14.6 || .390 ||  || .904 || 1.1 || 4.2 || 1.1 || .1 || 2.8
|- class="sortbottom"
| style="text-align:center;" colspan="2"|Career
| 746 ||  || 35.1 || .414 ||  || .780 || 4.8 || 7.0 || 1.8 || .2 || 11.8
|- class="sortbottom"
| style="text-align:center;" colspan="2"|All-Star
| 3 || 1 || 12.3 || .286 ||  || .500 || 1.0 || 1.0 || .7 || .3 || 1.7

Playoffs

|-
| style="text-align:left;"|1972
| style="text-align:left;"|Chicago
| 4 ||  || 36.0 || .415 ||  || .857 || 6.3 || 8.3 ||  ||  || 14.0
|-
| style="text-align:left;"|1973
| style="text-align:left;"|Chicago
| 7 ||  || 36.9 || .349 ||  || .733 || 5.3 || 5.1 ||  ||  || 14.4
|-
| style="text-align:left;"|1974
| style="text-align:left;"|Chicago
| 11 ||  || 42.4 || .424 ||  || .830 || 4.3 || 6.8 || 1.5 || .3 || 14.6
|-
| style="text-align:left;"|1975
| style="text-align:left;"|Chicago
| 13 ||  || 42.1 || .409 ||  || .747 || 5.2 || 4.7 || 1.5 || .4 || 15.1
|-
| style="text-align:left;"|1977
| style="text-align:left;"|Chicago
| 3 ||  || 44.7 || .158 ||  || .833 || 5.0 || 9.7 || 3.3 || .3 || 5.3
|- class="sortbottom"
| style="text-align:center;" colspan="2"|Career
| 38 ||  || 40.8 || .389 ||  || .784 || 5.0 || 6.2 || 1.7 || .3 || 13.9

References

External links
 Career Stats at basketball-reference.com
 Obituary in the Chicago Tribune
 The Bullfighter - an upcoming documentary film
 Book, "Cincinnati's Basketball Royalty", by Gerry Schultz

1947 births
2009 deaths
African-American basketball players
American men's basketball players
Basketball coaches from Pennsylvania
Basketball players from Pennsylvania
Chicago Bulls announcers
Chicago Bulls draft picks
Chicago Bulls players
Cincinnati Royals players
Continental Basketball Association coaches
Milwaukee Bucks players
National Basketball Association All-Stars
People from Beaver County, Pennsylvania
People from East Liverpool, Ohio
Point guards
Saint Francis Red Flash men's basketball players
Sportspeople from the Pittsburgh metropolitan area
20th-century African-American sportspeople
21st-century African-American people